André Gonçalves may refer to:

 André Gonçalves (explorer) of the 15th–16th centuries, assisted in discovery of Brazil
 André Gonçalves (painter) (1685–1754), religious artist
 André Gonçalves (footballer) (born 1992), Swiss footballer
 André Gonçalves (actor), Brazilian actor